Henry Evans may refer to:

 Henry Evans (Australian cricketer) (1846–?), Australian cricketer
 Henry Evans (English cricketer) (1857–1920), English cricketer
 Henry Evans (Evanion) (1832–1905), conjurer, ventriloquist and humorist
 Henry Evans (RFC officer) (1880–1916), British aviator and flying ace
 Henry Evans (theatre) (fl. 1583–1608), Elizabethan theatrical producer
 Henry Clay Evans (1843–1921), American politician and businessman
 Henry Congreve Evans (1860–1899), known as Harry Congreve Evans South Australian journalist and editor
 Henry James Evans (1912–1990), Australian geologist, discoverer of the Weipa bauxite deposits in 1955
 Henry H. Evans (1836–1917), American politician from Illinois
 Henry R. Evans (1861–1949), American writer and amateur magician
 Henry William Evans (1890–1927), English athlete, rugby player and surgeon
 Shepherd Book, a fictional character in the TV series Firefly and the sequel film Serenity, born as Henry Evans

See also
 Harry Evans (disambiguation)